Bolesław Błaszczyk (born 28 June 1964) is a former Polish footballer who played as a forward.

Biography

Błaszczyk started his career in the youth teams of Arka Gdynia and Lechia Gdańsk. Błaszczyk made his first team debut in the Polish Cup in a 0–0 draw with Zawisza Bydgoszcz aged 16 years, 2 months, and 13 days, making his league debut 3 days later against Stoczniowiec Gdańsk. During his time at Lechia he played in the early stages of the III liga win and the 1983 Polish Cup win. In January 1983 Błaszczyk moved to Bałtyk Gdynia, playing a total of 38 games scoring 5 goals over the span of 2 years. During his time at Bałtyk he played in the 1983 under-20's World Cup, being part of the squad that finished in third place. In January 1985 Błaszczyk moved to the Silesia region as part of his military service and joined Śląsk Wrocław as a result. During his time at Śląsk he played for the reserves but never played for the first team. Due to failing to make a first team appearance for Śląsk he joined Chrobry Głogów for the rest of his military service, playing 7 league games for the team. After his military service Błaszczyk moved back to Bałtyk Gdynia. His playing career ended at the age of 25 due to injury.

Honours

Lechia Gdańsk 
Polish Cup
 Winners: 1983
III Liga (group II) (third tier)
Winners: 1982–83

Poland U20's
Under 20's World Cup
Third-place: 1983

References

1964 births
Living people
Lechia Gdańsk players
Bałtyk Gdynia players
Śląsk Wrocław players
Chrobry Głogów players
Arka Gdynia players
Polish footballers
Association football forwards
Sportspeople from Gdynia
Sportspeople from Pomeranian Voivodeship